The 1947–48 La Liga was the 17th season since its establishment. Barcelona achieved their third title.

Since this season, the relegation play-offs were eliminated, being relegated only the two last qualified teams at the end of the season.

Team locations

Real Madrid played the first half of the season at Estadio Metropolitano, until the opening of the Nuevo Estadio de Chamartín.

League table

Results

Top scorers

External links
 Official LFP Site 

1947 1948
1
Spain